The Annie Award for Outstanding Achievement for Directing in a Feature Production (or Annie Award for Outstanding Achievement for Directing in an Animated Feature Production) is an Annie Award, awarded annually to the best animated feature film and introduced in 1996. It rewards directing for animated feature films. The recipients are directors as well as co-directors.

History
The award was formerly called Best Individual Achievement: Directing in 1996, Best Individual Achievement: Directing in a Feature Production in 1997, and Outstanding Individual Achievement for Directing in an Animated Feature Production from 1998 to 2001.

Multiple winners and nominations
The award has matched up with the Annie Award for Best Animated Feature every year except for 1997, 2006, 2011 and 2020. It has been awarded 26 times. Pete Docter, Rich Moore, John Lasseter and Dean DeBlois have won it twice, and Brad Bird and Lee Unkrich hold a record of three wins. 

Mamoru Oshii, Nora Twomey, Ron Clements, Tim Johnson, Ash Brannon, Phil Lord and Christopher Miller, David Silverman, Chris Wedge, Carlos Saldanha, Mark Dindal, John Musker, Sylvain Chomet, Andrew Adamson, Kelly Asbury, Sam Fell, Mamoru Hosoda, Don Hall, Tomm Moore, Genndy Tartakovsky, Chris Butler, Jennifer Lee, Benjamin Renner, Chris McKay, Byron Howard, and Makoto Shinkai have received two nominations each. Andrew Stanton, Chris Sanders, Dean DeBlois, Nick Park, Henry Selick and Rich Moore have received three nominations. John Lasseter, Chris Buck, Hayao Miyazaki, and Pete Docter, were nominated four times. Brad Bird and Lee Unkrich both hold a record five nominations.

Winners and nominees

1990s

2000s

2010s

2020s

See also
Academy Award for Best Animated Feature
Golden Globe Award for Best Animated Feature Film

References

External links 
 Annie Awards: Legacy

Annie Awards
Awards established in 1996
Film directing awards